Ataollah Khosravani (1919–date of death unknown) was an Iranian politician. He served as the secretary-general of Iran Novin Party and held several cabinet posts in the 1960s.

Early life and education
Khosravani was born in Tehran in 1919. He had six half-brothers from his father's first marriage. He graduated from the Adab primary school and the Tharvat junior high school. Then he attended the Alborz College in Tehran. He received a bachelor's degree in social sciences in France.

Career
Following his return to Iran Khosravani established a magazine entitled Afkar Iran with his brother. Then he was appointed an attaché to the Embassy of Iran in Paris. He served as the minister of labor in three successive cabinets starting from 9 May 1961. He first served in the cabinet led by Prime Minister Ali Amini and succeeded Ahmad Ali Bahrami in the post. He also served in the cabinet of Prime Minister Asadollah Alam between February 1963 and March 1964. He retained his post in the next cabinet led by Hassan Ali Mansur from 7 March 1964 and also, in the cabinet of Amir Abbas Hoveida from January 1965.

Khosravani was appointed secretary-general of Iran Novin Party 1965 when Prime Minister Hassan Ali Mansur who had been serving as secretary general of the party was assassinated. Next he was named as the interior minister to the cabinet led by Prime Minister Amir Abbas Hoveyda. Khosravani's term as the secretary general of the Iran Novin Party ended in 1969, and he was also removed from the cabinet of Amir Abbas Hoveyda. Manouchehr Kalali was the successor of Khosravani as the secretary-general of Iran Novin Party.

A report by CIA dated February 1976 stated that in mid-1974 Khosravani was secretly assigned by the Shah Mohammad Reza Pahlavi to analyse the status of the Iran Novin Party to reorganize it. At the end of his investigation Khosravani co-authored a report which partly led to the closure of the Party in 1975.

Personal life
While living in Paris, Khosravani married a French woman and had a son.

References

External links

1919 births
Year of death missing
20th-century Iranian politicians
Government ministers of Iran
Interior Ministers of Iran
Iranian magazine founders
Iran Novin Party Secretaries-General
Politicians from Tehran
People of Pahlavi Iran